The Mana series, known in Japan as , is a role-playing video game series from Square Enix, created by Koichi Ishii. The series began as a handheld side story to Square's flagship franchise Final Fantasy, although most Final Fantasy-inspired elements were subsequently dropped, starting with the second installment, Secret of Mana. It has since grown to include games of various genres within the fictional world of Mana. The music of the Mana series includes soundtracks and arranged albums of music from the series, which is currently composed of Final Fantasy Adventure and its remake Sword of Mana, Secret of Mana, Trials of Mana, Legend of Mana, Dawn of Mana, Children of Mana, Friends of Mana, Heroes of Mana, Circle of Mana, and Rise of Mana. Each game except for Friends and Circle has produced a soundtrack album, while Adventure has sparked an arranged album as well as a combined soundtrack and arranged album, Legend of Mana has an additional promotional EP, and music from Secret and Trials were combined into an arranged album. For the series' 20th anniversary, a 20-disc box set of previously-released albums was produced, as well as an album of arrangements by Kenji Ito, composer for several games in the series.

The music of Final Fantasy Adventure was composed by Kenji Ito, while Hiroki Kikuta composed Secret of Mana and Trials of Mana and Yoko Shimomura wrote the score to Legend of Mana. The music of the World of Mana subseries, composed of Children, Dawn, Friends, and Heroes of Mana, was composed by many different composers, with Ito, Kikuta, Shimomura, Tsuyoshi Sekito, Masayoshi Soken, and Ryuichi Sakamoto composing Dawn, Ito, Masaharu Iwata, and Takayuki Aihara writing Children, and Shimomura composing the music of Friends and Heroes. Rise of Mana was composed by an ensemble group including Ito, Kikuta, Shimomura, Sekito, Yasuhiro Yamanaka, and Kokia. Music from the series has been performed in live concerts such as the Orchestral Game Concerts and the Symphonic Game Music Concerts, and made up one fourth of the Symphonic Fantasies concert in Cologne, Germany. Music from the Mana series has also been arranged for the piano and published as sheet music books.

Final Fantasy Adventure

Final Fantasy Adventure, released as Seiken Densetsu: Final Fantasy Gaiden in Japan and Mystic Quest in Europe and marketed as a Final Fantasy spin-off, was composed by Kenji Ito; it was his second original score after that of SaGa 2 and his first solo work. The game was released in 1991 on the original Game Boy.  It was remade in 2003 for the Game Boy Advance as Sword of Mana, wherein features of the original game were reworked to be brought more in line with the direction the Mana series had taken with the later games. It also severed the game from the Final Fantasy series. Ito was also the composer for the 2003 Sword of Mana, for which he remixed some pieces from Final Fantasy Adventure as well as composing new ones. Ito's music is mainly inspired by images from the game rather than outside influences; however, he never played the games themselves. Final Fantasy Adventure received a soundtrack album and an arranged album, which were later released again as a single album. Sword of Mana also sparked a soundtrack album.

Original Sound Version

Seiken Densetsu Original Sound Version is a soundtrack album of music from Final Fantasy Adventure. It was composed by Kenji Ito, with the exception of "Theme of Chocobo", which was composed by Nobuo Uematsu for the Final Fantasy series. The album covers 27 tracks and has a duration of 34:40. It was published by NTT Publishing/Square on July 15, 1991, with the catalog number N23D-003.

The album was well received by critics such as Ryan Mattich of RPGFan, who termed it full of "quality compositions and timeless melodies" that created a "nostalgic listening experience". Another reviewer, in their review of the combined album, claimed that the sound hardware limitations of the Game Boy "forces composers to create strong melodies" and that the Final Fantasy Adventure soundtrack was "a perfect example of what quality Gameboy music should sound like".

Let Thoughts Ride on Knowledge

Seiken Densetsu: Let Thoughts Ride on Knowledge is a soundtrack album of music arranged from the Final Fantasy Adventure soundtrack. The original music was composed by Kenji Ito, while the versions on the album were arranged by Takayuki Hattori. The album covers 7 tracks and has a duration of 35:11. Each track covers several different songs from the original soundtrack. The pieces are arranged in an orchestral style, with moods ranging from "soft" to "powerful". It was published by NTT Publishing/Square on September 30, 1991, with the catalog number N30D-005.

The album was well received by critics such as Ryan Mattich of RPGFan, who called it "an album of epic ambition" and said that it let "these timeless melodies live on," "freed from the shackles of sound hardware limitations". Kero Hazel of Square Enix Music Online agreed, saying that "those 35 minutes of arranged music are worth every penny" in their review of the combined album. Another reviewer of the combined album called the tracks a "combination of great compositions and excellent arranging" and said that the tracks "flow smoothly between each other" creating "a superb thirty-five minutes of music".

Sound Collections

Final Fantasy Gaiden: Seiken Densetsu Sound Collections is a soundtrack album of music from Final Fantasy Adventure combining its soundtrack album and arranged album. The music was composed by Kenji Ito, while the arranged tracks, which comprise the first seven tracks of this album, were arranged by Takayuki Hattori. The album covers 34 tracks and has a duration of 69:51. It was published by NTT Publishing on August 25, 1995, with the catalog number PSCN-5029, and republished on October 1, 2004, with the catalog number NTCP-5029.

The combined album was as well received as the individual albums that make it up, with RPGFan calling it "one fantastic CD" that combined the "superb" arranged tracks with the "expressive" original tracks. Kero Hazel said that the album was worth buying for either component CD alone, if one did not already have them, but that the combination together made it a "fantastic album" of "great music".

Sword of Mana

Sword of Mana Premium Soundtrack is a soundtrack album of music from Sword of Mana, the enhanced remake of Final Fantasy Adventure. It was composed by Kenji Ito, and included reworked tracks from the original game as well as new material.  The second disc of the album contains piano arrangements of songs from the soundtrack, while a bonus disc included in the first edition of the album contains an orchestra arrangement of "Rising Sun ~ Endless Battlefield". The album covers 48 tracks and has a duration of 1:42:51, including the bonus disc. It was published by DigiCube on August 27, 2003, with the catalog numbers SSCX-10097~8, and republished by Square Enix on October 20, 2004, with the catalog numbers SQEX-10038~9.

The album reached #118 on the Japan Oricon charts. Patrick Gann of RPGFan enjoyed it, calling it a "truly a gem".  Estimating that around twenty percent of the original tracks had received "significant changes", he applauded the increase in sound quality and said that he "enjoy[ed] the OST tracks a great deal". The addition of the piano tracks and the orchestral track made the album a "fine soundtrack" and he said that acquiring the soundtrack would be a "very, very good idea". RPGamer, in their review of the game, said that the arrangements by Ito were "quite pleasing to the ear", though they noted that the quality of the music was diminished by the "terrible speakers" of the Game Boy Advance.

Track list

Secret of Mana and Trials of Mana

The scores for 1993's Secret of Mana, originally released as Seiken Densetsu 2 in Japan, and 1995's Trials of Mana, originally released as Seiken Densetsu 3 in Japan, were both composed by Hiroki Kikuta. Kikuta was originally chosen for Secret of Mana after Kenji Ito, who was originally slated for the project, was forced to drop it due to other demands on his time such as the soundtrack to Romancing SaGa. It was Kikuta's first video game score. Both games were produced for the Super Nintendo Entertainment System. Despite difficulties in dealing with the hardware limitations, Kikuta tried to express in the music of Secret of Mana two "contrasting styles", namely himself and the game. The purpose of this was to create an original score which would be neither pop music nor standard game music. Kikuta worked on the music for the two games mostly by himself, spending nearly 24 hours a day in his office, alternating between composing and editing to create an immersive three-dimensional sound. Rather than create MIDI versions of his compositions and rely on the sound engineers to create the sampled instruments (like most game music composers of the time), Kikuta made his own samples that matched the hardware capabilities of the Super NES so that he would know exactly how the pieces would sound on the system's hardware instead of having to deal with audio hardware differences between the original composition and the Super NES. Kikuta considers the score for Secret of Mana his favorite creation. His compositions for Secret of Mana and Trials of Mana were partly inspired by natural landscapes, as well as music from Bali. In addition to the soundtrack albums for the two games, 1995, Kikuta released an experimental album of arranged music from the two installments, titled Secret of Mana +, which features one 50-minute-long track.

Secret of Mana

Secret of Mana Original Soundtrack is a soundtrack album of music from Secret of Mana, released as Seiken Densetsu 2 Original Sound Version in Japan; the releases are identical aside from the packaging and localized English song titles. Secret of Mana was one of the first soundtrack releases in North America for the North American version of a game. The soundtrack was composed by Hiroki Kikuta. The soundtrack's music covers both "ominous" and "light-hearted" tracks, and is noted for its use of bells and "dark, solemn pianos". The title track to the game, "Fear of the Heavens", was designed by Kikuta to sync up with the title screen as it slowly faded in due to hardware limitations; at the time trying to match the audio and visual effects in a game was rare. Kikuta also started the track off with a "whale noise", rather than a traditional "ping", in order to try to "more deeply connect" the player with the game from the moment it started up; getting the sound to work with the memory limitations of the Super NES system was a difficult technical challenge. The album covers 44 tracks and has a duration of 1:06:01. It was published by NTT Publishing/Square on August 6, 1993, with the catalog number N25D-019, and reprinted by NTT Publishing on August 25, 1995, and October 1, 2004, with the catalog numbers PSCN-5030 and NTCP-5030. A remastered version of the soundtrack, also titled Secret of Mana Original Soundtrack, was released by Square Enix on February 21, 2018, to correspond with the 3D remake of the game. The remastered album contains 53 tracks across 3 discs and has a duration of over 3 hours.

The album was well received by reviewers such as Eve C. of RPGFan, who called it "a beautifully composed CD" and said that it was one of the best soundtracks of any Super NES game. She said that the largest complaint with the album was the synthetic quality of the music necessitated by the Super NES's sound hardware, though she noted that the music pushed the limits of the system's hardware further than any other Super NES game. Jason Walton of RPGFan agreed, saying that "the music is composed extremely well, full of variety", though he did not like that the tracks were kept short instead of looping in order to fit all of the songs on one disc. Damian Thomas, in his review of the North American version of the album, also noted that the music was impressive for a Super NES game, and recommended the album as worth hunting for. Gamasutra, in an interview with Kikuta, described the music of Secret of Mana as leaving "a lasting impression on international audiences". IGN named the title track as the seventh best RPG title track in a 2006 feature, calling it "soft" and "magical", and saying that Kikuta "uses a mix of upbeat pipes and tinkering piano keys to bring the world of Mana to life". In a Reddit AMA, Kikuta said the track "Ceremony" is based on Indonesian gamelan music.

Trials of Mana

Seiken Densetsu 3 Original Sound Version is a soundtrack album of music from Trials of Mana. The soundtrack was composed by Hiroki Kikuta. Kikuta completed it with little assistance, having performed the sound selection, editing, effect design, and data encoding himself. The music has been described as ranging from "bouncy" and "energetic" to "flowing" and "serene". The soundtrack features 60 tracks on 3 discs and spans a duration of 3:19:21. The album was published by NTT Publishing on August 25, 1995, with the catalog numbers PSCN-5026~8 and republished by Square Enix on October 1, 2004, with the catalog numbers NTCP-5026~8. The main theme from Secret of Mana, "Where Angels Fear to Tread", called "Fear of the Heavens" there, makes a return in this installment.

Freddie W. of RPGFan, in his review of the album, named it as "one of the high points of Hiroki Kikuta’s work on the series". He described it as having a very cohesive "feel", and as being a "more refined and matured" version of the "feeling" of the Secret of Mana soundtrack. Square Enix Music Online's review agreed with the quality of the music, calling it "among the finest ever heard on the Super Nintendo". They also termed it "in many ways superior to the score of Seiken Densetsu 2", which they described as having been an "instant winner" due to the work of Kikuta.

Track list

Secret of Mana+

Secret of Mana+ is an arranged album of music from Secret of Mana and Trials of Mana. The music was composed and arranged by Hiroki Kikuta. The album is composed of a single track titled "Secret of Mana" that has a duration of 49:28. This track incorporates themes from the music of Secret as well as a few themes from Trials, which was still under development at the time. The style of the album is described as "experimental", using "strange sounds" such as waterfalls, bird calls, cell phone sounds, and "typing" sounds. The music has also been described as covering many different musical styles, such as "Debussian impressionist styles, his own heavy electronic and synth ideas, and even ideas of popular musicians". It was published by NTT Publishing/Square on October 29, 1993, with the catalog number N30D-021, and reprinted by NTT Publishing on August 25, 1995, and October 1, 2004, with the catalog numbers PSCN-5031 and NTCP-5031.

Daniel Kalabakov, in his review for RPGFan, said that while popular opinion of the album was split between those who liked and extremely disliked the album, he personally "loved" it.  He praised it for being an "unorthodox arrangement" and trying something new rather than being merely a piano or orchestral arranged album, the most common types. Chris Greening of Square Enix Music Online had similar feelings about the album, praising the wide range of styles and sounds and calling it an "unparalleled achievement". Simon of Square Enix Music Online added that it was "refreshing to see there is no compromise" between Kikuta's artistic vision and more traditional commercial styles.

Legend of Mana

Legend of Mana, released for the PlayStation in 1999, features music composed by Yoko Shimomura. She had previously composed for several Square games including Live A Live and Parasite Eve and had originally joined Square for the purpose of composing music for fantasy role-playing games. She was initially hesitant to compose for the Mana series, as she felt that it was so associated with the music of Ito and Kikuta. In 2002, Shimomura said that of all her compositions to date, she considered the soundtrack to Legend the one that best expresses herself. Shimomura claims that she prefers "passionate music that comes from the heart", and that she has to "feel the emotions of a piece in the extreme before I am able to write" the music by putting herself in the same mood as the piece is supposed to be in. Legend of Mana featured the first vocal track of any Mana game, "Song of Mana", which also serves as the game's opening theme. It was sung by Swedish vocalist Annika Ljungberg, who was chosen by Shimomura because she "wanted to stay away from working with someone popular that everyone already knows". After hearing a sample of Annika's music, she flew to Sweden "straight away" to do an analog recording of the song. Four of the game's tracks were released as part of Drammatica: The Very Best Works of Yoko Shimomura, an arranged album highlighting the composer's work: "Legend of MANA ~Title Theme~", "Hometown Domina", "Colored Earth", and "Bejeweled City Ruined". Shimomura carefully chose the songs to be included on the album based on their apparent popularity among fans and how suitable they are for orchestra. In addition to the soundtrack album, a promotional album of music from Legend of Mana was produced and was included with preorders of the game in North America.

Original Soundtrack

Seiken Densetsu / Legend of Mana Original Soundtrack is a soundtrack album of music from Legend of Mana, composed by Yoko Shimomura. The soundtrack features 55 tracks on 2 discs and spans a duration of 2:10:37. It includes "Song of Mana", sung by Swedish vocalist Annika Ljungberg. The song was later made available on the Square Vocal Collection album in 2001. The music covers many styles including piano, hard rock, and techno. The soundtrack was published by DigiCube on July 23, 1999, with the catalog number SSCX-10034, and reprinted by Square Enix on October 20, 2004, with the catalog numbers SQEX-10036~7.

The album reached #65 on the Japan Oricon charts and stayed there for two weeks. Patrick Gann of RPGFan heavily praised it, saying, "It is simply amazing. The synth quality, the composition quality... Everything about it, quality." He cited the "town" themes as Shimomura's weakest, but said that the more "emotional" pieces were much better. Gann also noted Ljungberg as an "amazing" vocalist. RPGamer's review of the album was also praising, calling the composition "excellent", the sound quality "superb", and that it kept the "atmosphere" of previous Mana game soundtracks.

Track list

Music Selection

Legend of Mana Music Selection is a promotional album of music from Legend of Mana included in preorders of the game in North America. The music was composed by Yoko Shimomura. The soundtrack features five tracks and spans a duration of 18:34. It was published by Square on June 1, 2000, with the catalog number 3TP-0012K.

Legend of Mana Arrangement Album: Promise

Square Enix has also made a Legend of Mana arrangement album named Promise.

World of Mana
In 2005, Square Enix announced plans for World of Mana, a new series of titles in the Mana franchise, whose titles would span more video game genres than the original series. Koichi Ishii, the creator of the Mana series, decided even before he worked on 2002's Final Fantasy XI about creating new Mana games, but first wanted to create a goal for the new series, and eventually decided to make it about exploring how to add "the feeling of touch" to a game. After he saw the game Half-Life 2 at E3 in 2003, he felt that its physics engine was the one he needed. World of Mana went on to comprise four new games in addition to the remake of Final Fantasy Adventure; Koichi Ishii served as director or producer for all of them as he had for the previous games in the series. In 2006, a Mana installment for the Wii was considered but did not enter development. In April 2007, a month after the release of the final game of the World of Mana, Ishii left Square Enix to lead his own development company, named Grezzo; no further games in the series have been announced since. Three of the new games of World of Mana sparked soundtrack releases, with each composed by a different artist or group of artists: Children of Mana, released in 2006 for the Nintendo DS, Dawn of Mana, released in 2006 for the PlayStation 2, and Heroes of Mana, released for the Nintendo DS in 2007. The music of Dawn of Mana also formed the basis of a promotional album included with preorders of the game in Japan, while the music of Yoko Shimomura for Seiken Densetsu: Friends of Mana, a 2006 multiplayer role-playing game for Japanese mobile phones never saw any album releases.

Children of Mana

Seiken Densetsu DS: Children of Mana Original Soundtrack is a soundtrack album of music from Children of Mana, known as Seiken Densetsu DS: Children of Mana in Japan. The soundtrack was composed by Kenji Ito, Masaharu Iwata, and Takayuki Aihara, and covers a range of musical styles including rock and roll, jazz, and classical orchestra. Ito served as the lead composer. The instruments themselves, however, due to the limitations of the Nintendo DS hardware, have been described as not being "especially aesthetic or realistic". The soundtrack features 33 tracks on 2 discs and spans a duration of 1:24:13. It was published by Square Enix on May 9, 2006, on the Japanese iTunes Store, but has not been released as a physical album.

Chris Greening of Square Enix Music Online, in his review of the album, reacted positively to the score, calling it a "colourful, diverse, and rich experience overall". He called the tracks by Iwata and Aikara the "core" of the album, saying that the tracks by Ito felt "banal" and "formulaic" which he attributed to Ito being too overworked to focus on the album. RPGamer, in their review of the game, called the music "pretty nice". They noted that the music did not stand out as much as the visuals of the game, though they still "conveyed the theme", and that the "town" tracks were in their opinion weaker than the rest of the soundtrack.

Track list

Dawn of Mana

Seiken Densetsu 4 Original Soundtrack -Sanctuary- is a soundtrack album of music from Dawn of Mana, known as Seiken Densetsu 4 in Japan. The soundtrack was composed by Kenji Ito, Tsuyoshi Sekito, Masayoshi Soken, Hiroki Kikuta, Yoko Shimomura, and Ryuichi Sakamoto, with many of the tracks composed by one artist arranged by another. The styles portrayed on the soundtrack cover "soft, heartwarming tunes", fast-paced "rock and roll style" tracks, and "dark and dramatic tunes", while the arranged songs that appear on the fourth disc of the soundtrack album are split between orchestral and rock and roll styles. The theme song to the game, "Dawn of Mana", was composed by Grammy-winning composer Ryuichi Sakamoto, and was inspired by the image of the Mana tree shown at the title screen. The composition of the soundtrack was done under a great deal of time pressure; Soken has said that he composed 32 tracks in 52 days at a breakneck pace, and Sekito has said that Ito conducted the orchestral recordings while ill to make the deadline. The soundtrack features 106 tracks on 4 discs and spans a duration of 4:19:41. It was published by Square Enix on January 24, 2007, with the catalog numbers SQEX-10083~6.

Dennis Rubinshteyn of RPGFan was pleased by the soundtrack, saying that the music met his high expectations for what he called the "only redeeming quality left" to the series since Legend of Mana. Summing the album up as a "solid soundtrack with great songs and a lot of variety", he named Sekito's tracks as the least appealing on the soundtrack, causing some parts of the album as a whole to be "hit or miss". Bryan Matheny of Square Enix Music Online held the opposite opinion, calling Sekito's pieces what "made this work bearable" and saying that he "just can't get into this soundtrack", especially the first three discs, which were full of "boring and underdeveloped" tracks. Chris Greening of Square Enix Music Online's review, however, was more in line with RPGFan's, wherein he praised the "diversity" and "glorious spectrum of emotion" found in the soundtrack. He cited the synthesizer operation as a weak point as well as the order of the tracks, and singled out Sekito's tracks as "forgettable" and "repetitive".

Track list

Breath of Mana

Breath of Mana is a promotional album of music from Dawn of Mana included with preorders of the game in Japan. Despite the many composers of the full soundtrack, the five songs on Breath were all composed and arranged by Kenji Ito. Three of the songs, "Breath of MANA", "Unforgotten Memories", and "Rising Sun (piano solo ver.)", did not appear on the full soundtrack album. The songs on the disc are "gentle melodies" using orchestra and piano. The five songs cover a duration of 13:41. The disc was published by Square Enix on December 21, 2006. A review of the album by Dennis Rubinshteyn of RPGFan called it a "good showcase" of the strengths of the full album, which were in his opinion the tracks by Ito. He felt that the tracks on the single were "superb", and said that it was a shame that two of the tracks were not found on the soundtrack album.

Heroes of Mana

Seiken Densetsu: Heroes of Mana Original Soundtrack is a soundtrack album of music from Heroes of Mana, known as Seiken Densetsu: Heroes of Mana in Japan. The soundtrack was composed by Yoko Shimomura. The musical style of the tracks is primarily orchestral, with the addition of a strong piano and drums that sometimes verge on a more tribal rhythm. The soundtrack features 49 tracks on 2 discs and spans a duration of 2:24:28. Three of the game's tracks were released as part of Drammatica: The Very Best Works of Yoko Shimomura, an arranged album highlighting the composer's work: "To the Heroes of Old ~Opening Theme from Heroes of Mana~", "The Way the Heart Is" (as "Tango Appassionata"), and "The Tale Told by the Wind ~Ending Theme from Heroes of Mana~". Shimomura carefully chose the songs to be included on the album based on their apparent popularity among fans and how suitable they are for orchestra. The Heroes of Mana soundtrack was published by Square Enix on April 18, 2007, with the catalog numbers SQEX-10095~6.

Denis Rubinshteyn, in his review of the album, said that while the game itself was poor, "the music is a treat". Calling the music "solid" and "enjoyable", he highlighted Shimomura's use of drums and variations on themes as particularly worthy of praise. Don Kotowski of Square Enix Music Online agreed, saying that Square Enix "made the right decision" in asking Shimomura to compose the soundtrack, as she was able to "capture the spirit of the Mana series extremely well". He singled out the "battle tracks and event themes" as the weakest tracks and "'The Tale Told by the Wind' and the final battle" as some of the best.

Track list

20th Anniversary
For the 20th anniversary of the Mana series in 2011, Square Enix released a number of albums. These included several arranged albums, as well as a box set of every soundtrack album from the series plus Let Thoughts Ride on Knowledge and Secret of Mana+. The twenty-disc set, entitled Seiken Densetsu Music Complete Book, was released on September 14, 2011. It includes music composed by Kenji Ito, Nobuo Uematsu, Hiroki Kikuta, Yoko Shimomura, Masaharu Iwata, Takayuki Aihara, Tsuyoshi Sekito, Masayoshi Soken, and Ryuichi Sakamoto. The album has a total length of 19:35:19.

Re:Birth

As a part of the anniversary celebration, Square Enix released an album of arrangements of music from the series, Re:Birth/Seiken Densetsu Kenji Ito Arrange Album. The album features ten arrangements by Kenji Ito of music he composed for Final Fantasy Adventure, Sword of Mana, Children of Mana, and Dawn of Mana. Six tracks are from the original game, two from Dawn, and one each from the other two games. The album was published by Square Enix on October 19, 2011, with a duration of 45:06. The arrangements cover a wide variety of genres, from vocal and chamber music to techno and dubstep. The album was originally planned to be followed soon after by two more similar albums, one each from Hiroki Kikuta and Yoko Shimamura, but those albums were never released.

Patrick Gann of RPGFan felt that the album's tracks were "hit-or-miss", containing some stellar arrangements mixed in with lackluster ones. He recommended it to any collector of Mana music. Jayson Napolitano of Original Sound Version was more complimentary towards the album, enjoying many of the tracks that Gann did not, though he too was not as impressed by the Dawn of Mana arrangements.

Rise of Mana

In 2014, Square Enix released Rise of Mana, a free-to-play action role-playing game for iOS and Android. The music of Rise of Mana was composed by a group of different composers: the majority of the music was handled by Tsuyoshi Sekito. In addition to Sekito, the soundtrack was also contributed to by three previous Mana composers: Kenji Ito (Final Fantasy Adventure, Children of Mana, Dawn of Mana), Hiroki Kikuta (Secret of Mana, Trials of Mana) and Yoko Shimomura (Legend of Mana, Heroes of Mana). Also joining the team was sound engineer Yasuhiro Yamanaka. In all, 21 out of the 28 composed pieces were done by Sekito. Ito, Kikuta, Shimomura and Yamanaka each contributed one track. The soundtrack featured an arrangement for piano of "Rising Sun", the series' main theme. Yamanaka acted as sound director, while poro@lier created the piano arrangements for both "Rising Sun" and the game's theme song.

The game's theme song, "Believe in the Spirit", was composed, written and sung by Japanese singer-songwriter Kokia. Prior to coming on board, she had little knowledge of the Mana series. As with her previous compositions for video games, Kokia tried to get a feel for the game's atmosphere before starting, either through playing the game directly or looking at behind-the-scenes material related to the game's world. With "Believe in the Spirit", she worked to create a song that would appeal to both players and the production team. The track was performed using strings, a tin whistle, an acoustic guitar and percussion. The arrangement was done by Mina Kubota.

Seiken Densetsu: Rise of Mana Original Soundtrack was released on April 23, 2014, through Square Enix's music label. Andrew Barker of RPGFan was cautiously positive about the album: he described "Believe in the Spirit" as being "hit-or-miss" for different listeners while evoking memories of earlier Mana games. The rest of the soundtrack was generally praised: the first half's restful melodies were the stand-out tracks and said to be the strongest, while the later upbeat tracks were praised for their various energizing qualities. Some tracks, such as "The Drip Drip Drip of Memory", being fairly weak and forgettable. Barker generally compared the music to that of Final Fantasy XII, recommending it for fans of the latter and finishing that the album was generally good despite some unmemorable pieces. Chris Greening of Video Game Music Online gave the album a 2.5-star rating: he was most positive about the tracks from the guest composers like Ito and Shimomura. While he praised Sekito for moving away from his traditional musical style, he felt that the result was fairly mixed, with some tracks lacking the proper emotional drive and others "falling flat". "Believe in the Spirit" was praised for avoiding J-pop elements and sticking with its Celtic style, being favorably compared to the theme songs of Xenogears. Overall, Green felt that, while it had good production value and was substantially better than other mobile game soundtracks, but lacked the emotional impact of previous Mana titles in the majority of its tracks. Many reviewers of the game also praised the soundtrack.

Legacy
The track "Fear of the Heavens" from Secret of Mana was performed by the Tokyo Symphony Orchestra for the third Orchestral Game Concert in 1993, while "Meridian Child" from Trials of Mana was performed for the fifth Orchestral Game Concert in 1996. "Fear of the Heavens" was also performed at the fifth Symphonic Game Music Concert in 2007 in Leipzig, Germany. Legend of Manas title theme was also performed by the Australian Eminence Symphony Orchestra for its classical gaming music concert A Night in Fantasia 2007. Kenji Ito, along with other players, performed "Fool's Dance" from Dawn of Mana at the Extra: Hyper Game Music Event 2007 concert in Tokyo on July 7, 2007. Sinfonia Drammatica, an August 4, 2009 concert performed by the Royal Stockholm Philharmonic Orchestra in Stockholm, Sweden, featured several Mana songs as part of a combination of Yoko Shimomura's album Drammatica and the previous Stockholm Symphonic Shades concert. These tracks, all from Drammatica, were "Colored Earth", "Sparkling City", "Title Theme", and "Hometown Domina" from Legends of Mana; none of the Heroes of Mana tracks on the album were played at the concert.

Music from the series made up one-fourth of the music in the Symphonic Fantasies concerts in Cologne and Oberhausen in September 2009 which were produced by the creators of the Symphonic Game Music Concert series and conducted by Arnie Roth. The concerts featured a suite comprising Secret of Mana songs "Fear of the Heavens", "Flight into the Unknown", "Eternal Recurrence", "Premonition", "The Sorcerer", and "Rose and Spirit", as well as a boss battle encore suite which included "Meridian Festival". On February 6, 2011, the Eminence Symphony Orchestra played a concert in Tokyo as part of the Game Music Laboratory concert series as a tribute to the music of Kenji Ito and Hiroki Kikuta. The concert included "Bodorui", "Mana Temple", and "Rising Sun" from Final Fantasy Adventure; "Kind Memories", "Crisis", and "Meridian Dance" from Secret of Mana; and "Meridian Child" from Trials of Mana. The Final Fantasy Adventure pieces were played on the piano by Ito. A concert composed of music from the Re:Birth album and the Re:Birth II SaGa series album was performed in Tokyo on May 9, 2015, and in Osaka on May 10. The concert was produced by Ito, and featured him on piano.

Music from the original soundtracks of the Mana games has been arranged for the piano and published by DOREMI Music Publishing. Books are available for the soundtracks to Dawn of Mana, Legend of Mana, and Sword of Mana. Two companion books have also been published as Seiken Densetsu Best Collection Piano Solo Sheet Music first and second editions, with the first edition covering tracks from Final Fantasy Adventure, Secret of Mana, and Trials of Mana, while the second adds tracks from Legend of Mana and Dawn of Mana. All songs in each book have been rewritten by Asako Niwa as beginning to intermediate level piano solos, though they are meant to sound as much like the originals as possible. Additionally, KMP Music Publishing has published a book of the piano album included in the Sword of Mana soundtrack album, which was arranged by Kenji Ito.

See also
Music of the Final Fantasy series

References

External links
Official World of Mana website (archived) 

Mana Series
Mana (series)
Mana Series